Agata Materowicz (born 1963) is a contemporary Polish artist. She is a multi-disciplinary artist specialises in oil painting, including copies of masterworks and portraits painting, animation, puppetry, installation art, photography,  sculpture, drawing, graphic design and others.

Biography 
Born in Warsaw, Materowicz received her MFA in Visual Arts (Puppet Animation, Painting and Drawing) from the Academy of Fine Arts, Lodz, Poland, and  BFA in Computer Graphic Design from University Of Computer Sciences and Skills, Łódź, Poland.
Materowicz graduated with honours from the Faculty of Visual Arts at Academy of Fine Arts in Lodz, Poland. She achieved top marks for her(Girl Reading a Letter at an Open Window – Johannes Vermeer's) project and theory thesis assignments: "Puppet for Film Animation" Faculty of Puppet Animation, promoter prof. Marek Skrobecki and "Painting for the Scenography of the Animated Film" Faculty of Painting and Drawing, promoter prof. Jolanta Wagner. Contemporary Multimedia Artist. She is very active in the following art areas:  photography, painting, sculpture, ceramics, illustrations, computer graphics art, design and editorial. She illustrated children's book and also some of them designed and published.
The author of several scientific articles and publications including copyright infringement.
She gained her Computer Graphic Design Bachelor of Arts from the WSInf, Lodz. She has also  Diploma of Landscape Architecture- Warsaw College of Architecture,  Diploma of Marketing- Ciechanow Collage of Marketing,  Diploma of Architecture – Warsaw Collage. She received the certificate – ArtCamp Digital Photography / Open Air-International Summer School of Art, University of West Bohemia – Czech Republic. – University of West Bohemia in Pilsen and the certificate of the Academy of Photography in Warsaw. She also holds a certificate of Internet Marketing, Adobe, Corel Draw, computer graphics, web design organised by Apple. In the 1980s she was the co-founder and then president of the Music Club. Anna Jantar "Bursztyn"and as the chairman she organized concerts, authors readings and exhibitions. Honorary Members of the Club were: Jarosław Kukulski, Natalia Kukulska, Eleni Tzoka, Halina Frackowiak, Romuald Lipko, Zbigniew Holdys,  Marek Karewicz, Michal Rybczynski, Danuta Mizgalska. From 1985 to 1987 Agata worked as a graphic editor for "Weekly Ciechanowski".
In 1991, she was co-founded of the "Association of Painters and Sculptors – Warsaw Old Town".
She was the Photography Instructor teaching young people techniques how to see things differently.

Awards and honors

 2014 – Scenography, puppets: design and construction  for Natalia Kukulska video "Headdress" (Polish:  Pioropusz)
 2013 -Master's Degree, project: "Illusions in Art  – the road from painting to the movie" – nominated for the Best Fine Arts Diploma in Poland,  Diplomas 2013
 2012 – Art Scholarships for her outstanding achievements: from the Polish Minister of Science and Higher Education 
 2012 – Art Scholarships from the Marshal of Lodz Region in 2013
 2011 – Award Gallery Kobro in 29 Strzeminskiego Competition at ASP Lodz
 2006 – Award Photo Competition „Mokotow”, Warsaw
 2007 – Award Photo Competition " My way of seeing Warsaw“. Awarded photo was promoted the city of Warsaw on billboards, citylighs and other promotional materials in Poland and aboard.
 2004 – Winner ADDage.com Logo Competition (USA)
 1979 – Silver Medal at Shankar's International Children's Competition, New Delhi, India

Solo exhibitions

 2013 – „Alter Ego” – Photo Exhibition at Parramatta Art Gallery Sydney – Australia – July 2013
 2007 – "The Four Eyes" – Art Gallery „Ogrod” – Jablonna
 1998 – Polish Art and Handicrafts Exhibition – Trade Formex '98 in Stockholm
 1987 – "Fimo World of Agata Materowicz” Cultural Centre in Ciechanów 
 1984 – "Anna Jantar- First Step- Last Step”  at the Students Club „Stodola” – Warsaw, then moved to Lublin, Łódź, Kraków. Poznań

Group exhibitions
 2015 –  The Spring Arts & Heritage Centre, Havant, UK
 2014 – Gallery Neon "Łódź z Łódzi" (eng: Boat from Boat), Wrocław
 2014 – Museum of Textiles "Prime Time", Łódź 
 2013 – International Festiwal "Art & Documentation", Łódź 
 2013 – Exhibition:"Boat from Łódź". Work exhibition- "Brick Boat", Strzegom
 2013 – Professors and students post symposium exhibition:"Me, Here and Now" Gallery Kobro – Łódź 
 2012 – Participant's exhibition ArtCamp Digital Photography/ Open Air– International Summer School of Art. University of West Bohemia – Plzen, Czech Republic
 2012 – Exhibition: „Łódź, the Transborder City, Transmediale Art” Scheiblera Factory, Łódź
 2012 – The Winners Exhibition: XXIX W. Strzeminskiego Competition. Gallery Kobro Łódź, catalogue: 
 2012 – Paintings Exhibition: VII Charity Auction: "Seed Art – Garden of Hope". Under the auspices of the National Museum in Warsaw, Warsaw University Library. Warsaw.
 2012 – Participation in the project: "Embroider Lodz", Ksiezy Mlyn, Gallery Manhattan, Łódź
 2012 – Exhibition "Łódź, the Transborder City”, Park-Gardener's Cottage, Zrodliska in Łódź
 2012 – Painting Exhibition:"Corpus”, Gallery -Free Space, ASP Lodz
 2011 – Painting Exhibition:"Risk” – Gallery: Short and Up to the Point. Łódź
 2007 – Participation in the post-competition Exhibition, PKiN Warsaw
 2007 – Participation in the Photo post-competition Exhibition: “Mokotow” Warsaw
 2007 – Photo Exhibition:"Janow Podlaski”, Town Hall, Deblin
 2006 – Participation in the Landscape Photographic Exhibition:"Janow Podlaski”, Ermitaz, Lazienki Krolewskie, Warsaw, Zielona Gora, Deblin.
 2005 – Photo Exhibition:"Remember the Summer", Warsaw – Bemowo
 1991 – The Association of Artists, Painters and Sculptors Painting Exhibition, Warsaw – Old Town,” Landscape otherwise” – Club „Kadr” Warsaw
 1979 – The Winners post-competition Painting Exhibition:"Shankar'a”, New Delhi – India

Publications
 2013 – Participation in the International “The Booooooom and Adobe Remake Photo Project”. Photo interpretation of  Leonardo da Vinci “The Last Supper” Vancouver,  Canada
 2013 –  The catalogue “Me, Here and Now” from International symposium ASP Lodz, 
 2010  – The article "Examples of copyright infringement by daily newspaper Zycie Warszawy" published in “Ethics in the media vol.7: World standards vice everyday life" by Scriptorium, 2010. 
 2009 –  The article "A Puff of Absurdity , TVN Warsaw, 2011, Retrieved 10 June 2013
 2002 – “Peas around wild animals”, 
 2002 – "Peas and forest animals”, 
 2001 – Eleni CD "Something from Odysseus" Group members polymer clay figurines made by Agata Materowicz, Hellnic-Records / Pomaton EMI 
 2001 – “Peas and country animals”, 
 2000 – "Peas discovers wild animals”, 
 2000 – "Peas – kindergarten children's first book”, 
 1991 –  Illustrations made for prof. Anna Sieradzka book: "Cloak, train dress, peaked for-pointed cap:  art and fashion in Polish Modernism", Ossolineum, 1991,

Art catalogues 
A. Materowicz – coauthor “Strzeminski 2012 – Creative Arts and Design”, 2012, 
Agata Materowicz “Me, Here and Now”, 2013,

Art galleries displaying her art 
Kobro Gallery of Art, Łódź
Gallery: Free Space, Łódź

See also 
List of Polish artists
Anna Jantar

References

External links 

 
Dzbenska-Karpinska Marta. “Mothers- brave or crazy”, Published by Centrum Mysli Jana Pawla II, 2012, 
Shankar’s International Children’s Competition, Delhi
Anna Sieradzka: "Cloak, train dress, peaked for-pointed cap: art and fashion in Polish Modernism", Ossolineum, 1991, 
Eleni CD "Something from Odysseus", Group members polymer clay figurines made by Agata Materowicz, Hellnic-Records / Pomaton EMI 2001
Tygodnik Ciechanowski
Agata Materowicz on World Photography Organisation
Materowicz's solo photo exhibition in Warsaw-Bemowo, Gazeta Echo, 25 Maj 2007
Video interview with Agata Materowicz by TV Polsat -Teleepress
Materowicz artwork:I don't give up ArtInfo,2012
Video interview with Agata Materowicz, TV WOT
Video interview with Agata Materowicz, EMI DVD-"Small Handful of Life" memories of Anna Jantar and Jaroslaw Kukulski January 2013
A. Materowicz photo/promotional material Dziennik Lodzki, 4 April 2013
Warsaw Guest, page 8, Gosc Warszawski Retrieved 17 June 2013

Living people
1963 births
20th-century Polish painters
21st-century Polish painters
Photographers from Warsaw
Artists from Warsaw
20th-century Polish sculptors
21st-century Polish sculptors
20th-century Polish women artists
21st-century Polish women artists